Pseudozonaria nigropunctata, common name the black-spotted cowry, is a species of sea snail, a cowry, a marine gastropod mollusk in the family Cypraeidae, the cowries.

Description
Adult shell size varies between 17 mm and 42 mm. The dorsum surface is usually dark brown or greenish, while the base may be pale brown, yellowish or also pinkish, with small dark brown spots on the ventral margin.

Distribution
This species can be found in the Galapagos Islands, Ecuador and in northern Peru.

References

 Keen M. (1971) Sea shells of tropical West America. Marine mollusks from Baja California to Perú, ed. 2. Stanford University Press. 1064 pp.
 WoRMS

External links
 Encyclopedia of life
 Biolib

Cypraeidae
Gastropods described in 1828
Taxa named by John Edward Gray